Bathytoma consors is a species of sea snail, a marine gastropod mollusk in the family Borsoniidae.

Distribution
This marine species occurs in the Southwestern Pacific off the Solomon Islands.

Description
The height of this species attains 46 mm. The shell is off-white in color with brown stripes spiraling up the shell. the shell of Bathytoma consors is rough to the touch with the shell being bumpy similar to other species of its genus.

References

 Puillandre N., Sysoev A.V., Olivera B.M., Couloux A. & Bouchet P. (2010) Loss of planktotrophy and speciation: geographical fragmentation in the deep-water gastropod genus Bathytoma (Gastropoda, Conoidea) in the western Pacific. Systematics and Biodiversity 8(3): 371-394

External links
 Gastropods.com: Bathytoma consors

consors
Gastropods described in 2010